Eretis vaga is a species of butterfly in the family Hesperiidae. It is found in Cameroon, the Democratic Republic of the Congo (Katanga Province), Uganda, western Kenya, north-western Tanzania and Zambia. They live in forests.

References

Butterflies described in 1937
Celaenorrhinini